The Agrarian and Civic Union of Workers Bloc was a bloc in Kazakhstan, formed by the Agrarian Party of Kazakhstan and the Civic Party of Kazakhstan on 28 July 2004. At the 2004 legislative election, 19 September and 3 October 2004, the bloc won 7.1% of the popular vote and 11 out of 77 seats. It was dissolved after the election.

References

Political parties in Kazakhstan
Political party alliances in Asia